Paeaki Kokohu is a Tongan Olympic hurdler. He represented his country in the men's 400 metres hurdles at the 1992 Summer Olympics. His time was a 56.99 in the qualifiers.

References

External links
 

1966 births
Living people
Tongan hurdlers
Olympic athletes of Tonga
Athletes (track and field) at the 1992 Summer Olympics